Makronisos (lit. Long Island), or Makronisi, is an island in the Aegean sea, in Greece, notorious as the site of a political prison from the 1920s to the 1970s. It is located close to the coast of Attica, facing the port of Lavrio. It is the largest uninhabited Greek island.

It is part of the Kea-Kythnos regional unit and in the municipality of Kea.

History
In ancient times the island was called Helen. It protected the ancient harbours of Thorikos and Sounion. It was also called Macris (Μάκρις), from its length. Strabo describes it as 60 stadia (9.4 km) in length; but its real length is seven geographical miles (12 km). It was uninhabited in antiquity, as it is at the present day; and it was probably only used then for the pasture of cattle. Both Strabo and Pausanias derive its name from Helen of Troy, the wife of Menelaus: the latter writer supposes that it was so called because Helen landed here after the capture of Troy; but Strabo identifies it with the Homeric Cranae, to which Paris fled with Helen, and supposes that its name was hence changed into Helena. There cannot, however, be any doubt that the Homeric Cranaë was opposite Gythium in Laconia.

The Kea Channel between Makronisos and neighbouring Kea was the site of the sinking, in 1916, of HMHS Britannic, sister ship of the RMS Titanic.

Prison camp

Makronisos was used as a military prison island and concentration camp from the time of the Greek Civil War until the restoration of democracy, following the collapse of the Regime of the Colonels in 1974. Torture methods were used among others. Because of its history, it is considered a monument of the civil war era; therefore the island and the original structures on it are protected from alteration.

Among the prisoners of Makronisos were Apostolos Santas, Nikos Koundouros, Mikis Theodorakis, Leonidas Kyrkos and Thanasis Vengos.

Films
 Le Nouveau Parthénon (1975) by Kostas Chronopoulos and Giogos Chrysovitsianos.
 Happy Day (1976) by Pantelis Voulgaris. 
 Makronissos (2008), by Ilias Giannakakis and Evi Karabatsou.
 Like Stone lions at the gateway into night (2012), by Olivier Zuchuat

References

Hamilakis, Yannis, "The Other 'Parthenon': Antiquity and National Memory at Makronisos", Journal of Modern Greek Studies 20:2 (October 2002), pp. 307–338.

External links
http://www.abettergreece.com/Makronissos_en.html 

 
History of Greece (1949–1974)
Uninhabited islands of Greece
Internment camps
Landforms of Kea-Kythnos
Prison islands